The year 669 BC was a year of the pre-Julian Roman calendar. In the Roman Empire, it was known as year 85 Ab urbe condita. The denomination 669 BC for this year has been used since the early medieval period, when the Anno Domini calendar era became the prevalent method in Europe for naming years.

Events
Taharqa, king of Kush, invades and reconquers Egypt from the Assyrian Empire.
Esarhaddon dies in Harran while on his way to recover Egypt from the Kushites.
A transit of Venus occurs.

Births

Deaths
 Esarhaddon, king of Assyria

References

 
660s BC